Burrell S. James was a state legislator in South Carolina. He served in the South Carolina House of Representatives. His photograph was included in a montage of "Radical Republican" South Carolina state legislators.

He represented Sumter County, South Carolina. He was African American.

He married. He was one of the incorporators of the Sumter Land & Joint Stock Loan Association.

He was listed in an 1887 A.M.E. publication as involved in church work in Marion, North Carolina.

References

Year of birth missing (living people)
Republican Party members of the South Carolina House of Representatives
19th-century American politicians
African-American politicians during the Reconstruction Era